Roger Pingeon (28 August 1940 – 19 March 2017) was a professional road bicycle racer from France.

Biography
Growing up near the Jura Mountains, he was a cross-country skier as a teenager before taking up bicycle racing. He spent two years in Algeria on military service before starting his professional cycling career relatively late. He raced as a professional from 1964 to 1974. In 1967, Pingeon won the Tour de France. In 1969, Pingeon won the Vuelta a España and finished second behind Eddy Merckx in the Tour de France. He took a total of four Tour de France stage wins and finished in the top five of the race's general classification three times during his career. After retiring from competition he worked as a consultant for Radio Télévision Suisse between 1979 and 1998. Pingeon died on 19 March 2017 at his home in the village of Beaupont in the Ain department, about 100 km away from his hometown of Hauteville-Lompnes, after suffering a heart attack.

Career achievements

Major results

Source:

1964
 1st Poly Lyonnaise
1965
 2nd Grand Prix de la Trinité
 2nd Coppa Ugo Agostoni
 5th Grand Prix des Nations
 5th Overall Critérium du Dauphiné Libéré
 7th Overall Grand Prix du Midi Libre
 12th Overall Tour de France
1966
 2nd Overall Critérium National
1st Stage 2
 2nd Mont Faron hill climb
 4th Grand Prix des Nations
 8th Overall Tour de France
1967
 1st  Overall Tour de France
1st Stage 5a
1st Stage 2 Paris–Luxembourg
 2nd Overall Grand Prix du Midi Libre
 3rd Gênes–Nice
 4th Boucles de la Seine
 5th Trofeo Baracchi (with Raymond Poulidor)
 7th Paris–Tours
1968
 2nd National Road Race Championship
 3rd Overall Critérium National
 3rd Grand Prix of Baden-Baden (with Charly Grosskost)
 3rd Mont Faron hill climb
5th Overall Tour de France
1st Stage 15 & 18
 Combativity Award
 7th Liège–Bastogne–Liège
1969
 1st  Overall Vuelta a España
1st Stage 12 & 14b (ITT)
 2nd Overall Tour de France
1st Stage 9
 3rd Overall Critérium du Dauphiné Libéré
1st Mountains classification
 9th Overall Paris–Nice
1970
 2nd Overall Critérium du Dauphiné Libéré
 3rd Grand Prix de Saint-Raphaël
 3rd Mont Faron Hill Climb
 4th Overall Critérium National
1971
 3rd Trophée Baracchi (with Bernard Thévenet)
 3rd Coppa Ugo Agostoni
 5th Grand Prix des Nations
1972
 1st Stage 1 Critérium du Dauphiné Libéré
 2nd Overall Tour de Suisse
 5th Overall Tour de Romandie
 7th Overall Paris–Nice
1974
 1st Grand Prix de Plumelec
 1st Prix de Saint-Claud
 1st Prix de La Bastide
 3rd Trophée des Grimpeurs
 5th Overall Critérium du Dauphiné Libéré

Grand Tour results timeline

References

External links 

 

1940 births
2017 deaths
French male cyclists
Tour de France winners
French Vuelta a España stage winners
French Tour de France stage winners
Vuelta a España winners
Sportspeople from Ain
Cyclists from Auvergne-Rhône-Alpes